Events in the year 1766 in Norway.

Incumbents
Monarch: Frederick V (until 14 January); then Christian VII

Events
 4 April - Schack Carl Rantzau was appointed commander-in-chief of the Norwegian army.
 4 July - Charles of Hesse was appointed Steward of Norway.

Arts and literature

Births
23 March - Ole Paus,  ship's captain, shipowner and land owner (died 1855)
24 April - Carsten Tank, politician (died 1832)
6 September - Jens Johan Vangensten, politician (died 1837)
23 September - Ole Olsen Evenstad, politician (died 1833)

Deaths
25 March - Anna Krefting, businesswoman (born 1683)
28 December - Frederik Adeler, government official and landowner (born 1700)

See also